Tajmul Hossain is an Indian politician who currently serves as Cabinet Minister of State for Micro, Small and Medium Enterprises & Textile of Government of West Bengal. In May 2021, he was elected as the Member of West Bengal Legislative Assembly from Harishchandrapur (Vidhan Sabha constituency) as a candidate of All India Trinamool Congress

Personal life
Hossain is from Harishchandrapur, Malda District. His father name is Didar Hossain. He has passed H:S from Harishchandrapur High School in 1975. His Father is a converted muslim from Yadav Family , his old family stays Uttar Pradesh and some are still hindu yadav

Political life
He has been elected as the member of the West Bengal Legislative Assembly from Harishchandrapur (Vidhan Sabha constituency). He has won the election.

References 

Trinamool Congress politicians from West Bengal
West Bengal MLAs 2021–2026
Year of birth missing (living people)
Living people
People from Malda district